Aldi Community Games is an Irish independent voluntary organisation and National Governing Body providing opportunities for children and young people to grow and develop in a positive and healthy way while experiencing a wide range of sporting and cultural activities. The National Festivals are held over 2 weekends every year, where between 3 and 4,000 children compete for their area, town, county and province. Aldi Community Games is sponsored by Aldi.

"Community Games can be quite proud of its immense achievements in a wide range of interests and, indeed, positive community developments. Community Games is a truly developing organisation spreading good-will and healthy involvement for the benefit of all."
Joseph Connolly, Founder and Honorary Life Patron (1922 - 2008).

History
Aldi Community Games were set up in 1967 - initially only in Dublin as a way to deal with the problems of the lack of leisure-time activities for young people. In the first games, 3,000 took part at the John F. Kennedy Stadium in Santry;  the following year it was 5,000 - today, over 160,000 children compete for the chance to make it to the National Festival. For most of the games history, the National Finals were held in Mosney, County Meath. However, as the former campsite became unavailable due to being turned into a residential area for asylum seekers, from 2009 onwards the Games were held at the Athlone Institute of Technology in Athlone, County Westmeath.  This being the Jubilee year the Games return to Dublin to the state of the art National Sports Campus on 6 May and 18 to 20 August.

Events
The following are some of the sports and games that are played through Aldi Community Games:

Sports
Athletics
Badminton
Basketball
Camogie
Cycling
Futsal
Gaelic football
Gymnastics
Hurling
Pitch and putt
Rounders
Rugby
Skittles
Indoor soccer
Swimming
Table tennis 
Tennis
Volleyball

Individual Events
Art
Chess
Choir
Culture Corner
Draughts
Model making
Project
Quiz
Variety show
Disco dancing
Singing
Traditional set dancing
Comedy sketch/Drama
Music
Recitation

National Festival

Young people from all over Ireland aim to qualify for the Aldi Community Games National Festival each year. These take place over two weekends generally.

In the individual events, one competitor from each of the 26 competing counties qualifies for the National Festival. In the team events, one team from each of the 4 provinces of Ireland qualifies for the National Festival.

Where four teams qualify, semi-finals, a third-place play-off and final are played, except in draughts and chess where medal placings are decided on a league basis.

Theme song
"We're Singing as One" is the theme song of Aldi Community Games written, sung, arranged and produced by Colm O'Loughlin, a former competitor at the Games.

Past competitors
Many famous Irish people have competed in the games over the years and have very fond memories of Aldi Community Games.

I always enjoyed the Community Games in Cobh with my school friends and then the trip to Cork for the county finals.  The ultimate though was heading off on the train to Mosney for the all-Ireland finals, I remember and still have my little accreditation pass, just like what you get in the Olympics for access to all you need and the big book with all the results from years gone by.  That's where I set my early targets and goals for future years, by looking up athletes I knew and the times they ran at the Community Games finals each year before me..  Sonia O'Sullivan, May 2013
 
Sonia O'Sullivan
Eamonn Coghlan
Marcus O'Sullivan
John Treacy
James Nolan
Tommy Bowe
Seán O'Brien
Brendan Boyce
Sarah Lavin
Colin Farrell
Niall Breslin
Paul O'Connell
Ronan O'Gara
Saoirse Ronan
Denis Irwin
Niall Quinn
Pierce O'Callaghan
Killian Ganly 1997 Under 14, 5km Cross Country runner up
Orlaith Quigley 2002 Under 11 Hide and Go Seek

See also
Sport in Ireland

References

External links 
  Community Games

Festivals in Ireland
Multi-sport events in Ireland